CNN+ (CNN Plus) was a Spanish 24-hour television news channel. Launched in 1999 as a joint venture by Sogecable and Turner Broadcasting, a unit of Time Warner that owns CNN, it went off the air at the end of 28 December 2010. The management announced that CNN+ would be closed on December 31, 2010 because of low ratings and financial losses.

The slogan of CNN Plus was Está pasando, lo estás viendo (It's happening, you're watching it). By 2008, there were other 24-hour television channels — Intereconomía TV and TVE 24h — and CNN plus was no longer the audience leader in this type of general information. Also, CNN+'s ratings were low, peaking at 0.6%.

On December 18, 2009, the channels of Sogecable, a PRISA business, merged into the Mediaset group, which already controlled Spain's Telecinco channel.

The station went off the air at 11:59 p.m. (Spanish time) on 28 December 2010, and was replaced with 24-hour coverage of the reality show Gran Hermano, the Spanish version of Big Brother owned by Mediaset, and thereafter by Divinity.

References

External links
CNN+ at LyngSat Address

CNN
PRISA TV
Defunct television channels in Spain
Television channels and stations established in 1999
Television channels and stations disestablished in 2010
Spanish-language television stations
24-hour television news channels in Spain
Turner Broadcasting System Spain